"Truly Madly Deeply" is a song by Australian pop duo Savage Garden, released in March 1997 as the third single from their self-titled debut album (1997) by Roadshow and Warner Music. It won the 1997 ARIA Music Award for both Single of the Year and Highest Selling Single, and was nominated for Song of the Year. Written by bandmates Darren Hayes and Daniel Jones, the song is a reworking of a song called "Magical Kisses" that the pair wrote together during the recording of their debut album.

The song reached  1 in Australia, Canada, and the United States. Two music videos were filmed for the track: one for its original Australian release and another for the international market shot in Paris. In November 2019, the song was added to the National Film and Sound Archive's selection of recordings. The songs added to the list provide a snapshot of Australian life and have "cultural, historical and aesthetic significance and relevance".

Background and composition

Having got their breakthrough with the single "I Want You", Darren Hayes and Daniel Jones were sent to Sydney for eight months to record material for a debut album. For Hayes, it was his first time in life being away from his family and his native Brisbane. The longing for his family and his then-wife pushed him towards writing a song that would express those feelings. "Truly Madly Deeply" is written in the key of C major.

The chorus of "Truly Madly Deeply" was discussed until the last moment. Jones had doubts over the chorus they had come up with, which he felt did not fit with the rest of the song or Savage Garden's other material. During his evening meal he came up with the new chorus of "I want to stand with you on a mountain, I want to bathe with you in the sea, I want to lay like this forever until the sky falls down on me."

The next day, the duo brought up the new chorus for discussion with producer Charles Fisher in the studio, recording it as a trial. Fisher was delighted with the result, expressing his belief that Savage Garden had a number-one single.

Critical reception
Larry Flick from Billboard wrote that "this is the single that should help affirm that Savage Garden is more than a one-hit wonder." He described the song as a "percussive ballad" and complimented it for revealing "vocal skills and charisma not previously displayed". He noted further that "with its romantic lyrics and plush, guitar-etched instrumentation, this song "truly madly deeply" deserves as much airplay as top 40 programmers can heap upon it." Insider described it as "a truly sweet song, written out of homesickness, this love ballad has total staying power and is still played over 20 years later." Pan-European magazine Music & Media stated that "this Australian duo possess a fine knack for writing excellent mainstream pop with top flight radio appeal." They added that "this track, taken from their eponymous debut album, is no exception—as proven by its recent two-week stay at the top of Billboard's Hot 100 Singles chart." In 2018, Stacker placed the song at No. 21 on their list of the "Best pop songs of the last 25 years", noting it as "a quintessential '90s pop song". In 2019, they ranked it No. 9 on their list of the "Best 90s pop songs".

Versions

There are two versions of the song. The first was made available on the Australian version of the group's album, whereas the second version appears on the release of the album in Europe and America. This version was composed in 1997, and features a drum machine track instead of the more acoustic-sounding music featured on the Australian version. The European version also features on the group's greatest hits compilation, "Truly Madly Completely" and "The Singles".

Music video
Two music videos were made for the song. The original Australian video, which presents Hayes with long hair, features the band in a white room with several other people. Hayes is on a red sofa singing the song while Daniel performs on the piano. It was directed by Tony McGrath. The video used for the European market, which presents Hayes with short hair, was filmed in Paris. It was directed by Adolfo Doring. The video depicts the story of two lovers, a young man and a lady, who have been separated by circumstances. The woman arrives in Paris, possibly at Gare du Nord station, in search of her lover, who is also waiting for her. He is wandering in various places within the Montmartre area, including the Soleil de la Butte restaurant. In between the scenes involving the two lovers, Hayes can be seen walking around Paris, in locations such as the Place de la Concorde and the Jardin des Tuileries. He is singing, thereby acting as a narrator to the story involving the two lovers. Towards the end of the video, Hayes enters a small concert hall where Daniel Jones is playing guitar. Shortly afterwards, the young lady manages to find her lover, right in the centre of Paris, at the feet of the Tour Saint-Jacques. They are both filled with emotion on seeing each other again. The video ends with Hayes and Jones coming out of the concert hall, and coming across the two lovers who are rejoicing in their reunion.

Chart performance
The song was a major and sustained success in the US beginning in 1997. Entering the Billboard Hot 100 singles chart at No. 26 on 6 December 1997, it peaked at No. 1 for two weeks in January 1998 and lingered for a full year on the chart. It became the first song in the chart's history to spend its first 52 weeks inside the top 30. The song spent half a year in the top 10. It hit No. 1 on the Billboard Hot 100 Airplay chart and No. 2 on the Hot Adult Top 40 Tracks chart. It also entered the top 10 on the Rhythmic Top 40 chart. On the Billboard Top 40 Mainstream chart the song reached No. 1 for one week on 31 January before dropping to No. 2 as Celine Dion assumed the top spot with the theme to the hit film Titanic, "My Heart Will Go On". Savage Garden's single held at No. 2 for 10 weeks, before returning to the No. 1 spot on the week of 18 April.

The song eventually set a record for the most weeks of any single in history on the US Hot Adult Contemporary chart. In 1998 the song logged 11 weeks at No. 1 on this chart, but its full chart span lasted 123 weeks. That record would stand for just under two years, when another of the group's ballads spent its 124th week on the chart. The song was "I Knew I Loved You", from the album Affirmation. After leaving the main Adult Contemporary chart, the song entered the Hot Adult Contemporary Recurrents chart where it charted for another 202 weeks. The song was so popular that it re-entered Billboard's Hot Singles Sales chart in March 2002 and—four and a half years after its release—again became a U.S. Top 30 bestseller, remaining on that chart until late July 2002. The original version logged its final week on the Hot Adult Contemporary Recurrents chart on 17 June 2006. This combined with sales still makes it the #1 Billboard AC song of all time. In 2013, the song was listed at No. 35 on Billboards All Time Top 100.

The song also reached No. 1 in their home country of Australia, and in Canada. It reached No. 2 in Norway, Sweden, Austria and Ireland, and went top ten in France, Switzerland, the Netherlands, Belgium and the UK. In 1998, the song was certified a Gold single in France, for sales of 200,000 copies. In May 2001 the Australasian Performing Right Association (APRA), as part of its 75th Anniversary celebrations, named "Truly Madly Deeply" as one of the Top 30 Australian songs of all time.

Track listings

Australia
 CD single
 "Truly Madly Deeply"
 "Promises"
 "Truly Madly Deeply" (night radio mix)

 Maxi-CD single
 "Truly Madly Deeply"
 "Promises"
 "Truly Madly Deeply" (night radio mix)
 "I Want You" (Bastone club mix)
 "I Want You" (I Need I Want mix)

Europe
 CD1
 "Truly Madly Deeply" – 4:37
 "I'll Bet He Was Cool" – 4:58

 CD2
 "Truly Madly Deeply" – 4:38
 "Truly Madly Deeply" (Australian version) – 4:38
 "Truly Madly Deeply" (night radio mix) – 4:35
 "This Side of Me" – 4:09
 "Love Can Move You" – 4:47

United Kingdom
 CD1
 "Truly Madly Deeply" (album version) – 4:38
 "Truly Madly Deeply" (Australian version) – 4:38
 "This Side of Me" – 4:09
 "Love Can Move You" – 4:47

 CD2
 "Truly Madly Deeply" (album version) – 4:38
 "Truly Madly Deeply" (night radio mix) – 4:35
 "I Want You" (album version) – 3:52
 "I'll Bet He Was Cool" – 3:58

 Cassette
 "Truly Madly Deeply" (album version) – 4:38
 "I Want You" (album version) – 3:52

United States
 CD, 7-inch, and cassette single
 "Truly Madly Deeply" – 4:37
 "I'll Bet He Was Cool" – 4:58

Credits and personnel
Credits are adapted from the Savage Garden album booklet.

Studios
 Mixed at Whitfield Street Studios (London, England)
 Mastered at Sony Music Studios (New York City)

Personnel

 Darren Hayes – writing, lead vocals, background vocals, vocal arrangement
 Daniel Jones – writing, additional vocals, additional guitars, keyboards, sequencing
 Rex Goh – guitar
 Alex Hewitson – bass
 Terepai Richmond – drums, percussion
 Charles Fisher – production, vocal arrangement
 Jim Bonnefond – vocal arrangement
 Mike Pela – mixing
 Vlado Meller – mastering

Charts

Weekly charts

Year-end charts

Decade-end charts

All-time charts

Certifications and sales

Release history

In popular culture

The song was featured in the Paramount+/Nickelodeon animated series Big Nate.

Sandy and Junior version
The song was covered in 1998 by Brazilian brother-sister singing duo Sandy & Junior.  The Portuguese-language version, "No Fundo Do Coração" ("From the Bottom of the Heart"), was released as the third single from the teens' eighth album, Era Uma Vez (Ao Vivo). The album was certified Diamond in Brazil in 1999 by the Brazilian Association of Discs Producers (ABPD) for sales of over 1.8 million copies in Brazil alone. The album was their last for PolyGram Records before moving to Universal Music Group.

Cascada version

German Eurodance group Cascada covered "Truly Madly Deeply" on their debut album, Everytime We Touch (2007), and released it as the second single in the UK and Germany. Although the album version of the song is a ballad, there is also an up-tempo version of the song that is the main single version. Both versions are featured on the UK edition of the album. First released in the United States exclusively in the iTunes Store on 27 February 2006, the US physical release was 13 March 2007. The single entered the UK Singles Chart at number 17 solely on downloads and peaked at number four the following week, after its physical release. In Ireland, it remained in the top 4 for four weeks.

Track listing

 UK CD single part 1
"Truly Madly Deeply" (radio edit) – 2:57
"Everytime We Touch" – 3:19

 UK CD single Part 2
"Truly Madly Deeply" (radio edit) – 2:57
"Truly Madly Deeply" (album version) – 4:14
"Truly Madly Deeply" (club mix) – 4:34
"Truly Madly Deeply" (Styles & Breeze remix) – 5:03
"Truly Madly Deeply" (Thomas Gold remix) – 8:32
"Truly Madly Deeply" (DJ Bomba & El Senor remix) – 6:49
"Truly Madly Deeply" (Frisco Remix) – 6:07

 German 12-inch single
"Truly Madly Deeply" (2–4 Grooves Remix) – 6:00
"Truly Madly Deeply" (Thomas Gold Remix) – 8:29

 German CD single
"Truly Madly Deeply" (radio edit) – 2:55
"Truly Madly Deeply" (Thomas Gold radio edit) – 3:36
"Truly Madly Deeply" (2–4 Grooves radio edit) – 3:27
"Truly Madly Deeply" (album version) – 4:12
"Truly Madly Deeply" (Candy radio edit) – 3:18

 US 12-inch single
"Truly Madly Deeply" (radio edit) – 2:58
"Truly Madly Deeply" (album version) – 4:12
"Truly Madly Deeply" (Thomas Gold radio edit) – 3:38
"Truly Madly Deeply" (Tune Up! radio edit) – 2:58
"Truly Madly Deeply" (Thomas Gold remix) – 8:30
"Truly Madly Deeply" (UK club mix) – 4:34
"Truly Madly Deeply" (Tune Up! remix) – 4:35
"Truly Madly Deeply" (Styles & Breeze remix) – 4:58
"Truly Madly Deeply" (DJ Bomba & El Senor remix) – 6:48
"Truly Madly Deeply" (Frisco remix) – 6:00

 Australian single 2007
"Truly Madly Deeply" (2–4 Grooves Radio Edit) – 3:30
"Truly Madly Deeply" (UK radio edit) – 2:54
"Truly Madly Deeply" (radio pop mix) – 4:14
"Truly Madly Deeply" (Ivan Filini Radio Edit) – 3:07
"Truly Madly Deeply" (album version)
"Truly Madly Deeply" (Styles & Breeze Remix) – 5:03
"Truly Madly Deeply" (Tune Up! Remix) – 4:35
"Truly Madly Deeply" (DJ Bomba & El Senor Remix) – 6:49
"Truly Madly Deeply" (Thomas Gold Remix) – 8:30

Other remixes
"Truly Madly Deeply" (Alex K Remix) – 6:15
"Truly Madly Deeply" (original dance remix, Asian edition)
"Truly Madly Deeply" (original dance edit, Asian edition)

Charts

Weekly charts

Year-end charts

Certifications

Release and track listings

References

External links

1990s ballads
1997 songs
1997 singles
2006 singles
APRA Award winners
ARIA Award-winning songs
Billboard Hot 100 number-one singles
Cascada songs
Columbia Records singles
Number-one singles in Australia
Pop ballads
RPM Top Singles number-one singles
Savage Garden songs
Songs written by Daniel Jones (musician)
Songs written by Darren Hayes
Warner Music Group singles